Leszek Samborski (born 19 May 1955 in Dębica) - is a Polish politician, formerly a member of Real Politics Union and now Civic Platform and Sejm deputy (June 2004 - 2005).

References

Civic Platform politicians
1955 births
Living people
People from Dębica